Mea Culpa is a 2014 French thriller film directed by Fred Cavayé, starring Vincent Lindon, Gilles Lellouche and Nadine Labaki.

Plot
A police inspector and his former colleague investigate a series of murders in Toulon. Eventually they detect a killer gang who works for the Serbian mafia. The criminals stop at nothing to follow through on their mission but neither do the two Frenchmen.

Cast 

 Vincent Lindon as Simon
 Gilles Lellouche as Franck
 Nadine Labaki as Alice
  de Malglaive as Théo
  as Pastor
 Medi Sadoun as Jacquet
 Velibor Topic as Milan
  as Jean-Marc
  as Andréi
 Sofia Essaïdi as Myriam
 Sacha Petronijevic as Pietr
 Pierre Benoist as Boris
 Alexis Manenti as Slobodan
 Tomi May as Oleg
 Eric Bougnon as Karl
  as Kevin
 Justine Fabre as Manon

References

External links 
 
 
 Mea Culpa at Box Office Mojo
 

2014 films
2014 action thriller films
French action thriller films
2010s French-language films
Films directed by Fred Cavayé
Films scored by Cliff Martinez
Gaumont Film Company films
Films about the Serbian Mafia
2010s French films